The following is the qualification system and qualified athletes for the beach volleyball at the 2023 Pan American Games competitions.

Qualification system
A total of 64 Beach volleyball athletes will qualify to compete. Each nation may enter a maximum of 4 athletes (one team per gender of two athletes). As host nation, Chile automatically qualified a full team of four athletes (one team per gender). The best team per gender from NORCECA (North America, Central America and Caribbean) and CSV (South America) at the 2021 Junior Pan American Games also secured a quota. All other quotas were awarded through rankings (the three best teams per gender in the FIVB World Ranking, followed by five teams per gender from NORCECA and CSV.

Qualification timeline

Qualification summary

References

Qualification for the 2023 Pan American Games